

History and activities
The National Association of Sessional GPs (NASGP) was founded 1997 by a group of sessional GPs (independent general practitioners) with the aim of representing all fully qualified GPs working as locums, assistants, salaried GPs, returners and retainers.

The organisation has a chairman, quality lead and business manager, and publishes The Sessional GP, a bimonthly magazine on topics relating to sessional GPs. It also acts as an umbrella organisation for approximately 100 local sessional GP groups and GP locum chambers.

In 2015, the NASGP launched AppraisalAid, which is an online suite of information and templates specifically aimed at enabling freelance GP locums to keep record their reflections in preparation for their annual NHS appraisal. In 2016, the NASGP launched two new resources aimed at reducing waste in the National Health Service. The first was the online Standardised Practice Information Portal (Spip), replacing its paper predecessor (Standardised Practice Induction Pack), followed in autumn 2016 by the NASGP's online locum GP invoicing and booking system called LocumDeck.

Standardised Practice Information Portal (Spip) 
Spip claims to be an 'information air traffic control system' for GP practices, and has been reported on by the Care Quality Commission and the Medical Protection Society. Using Spip, a GP practice manager can add up to 500 items of local, practice specific information and the disseminate it to all their staff, at the same time enabling some of them to edit and add information, thus creating a crowdsourced and interactive document.

LocumDeck 
With an estimated 17,000 locum GPs working in the UK, most of them working independently, the NASGP has recognised the complexity of individuals managing their workload by creating a sophisticated online platform to easily manage their workload. In particular, locums wishing to make use of the NHS superannuation scheme must use relatively complex claim forms called Locum Form As (for each individual practice every month) and a monthly Locum Form B as a record of all superannuable income from that month.

Aims and objectives 
The group represents sessional GPs at a national level, provides support for members and for local sessional GP groups and chambers. The NASGP is involved in lobbying other medical organisations to ensure equitable representation of sessional GPs.

References

External links
 National Association of Sessional GPs

General practice organizations
Medical associations based in the United Kingdom